Kaushalendra Pratap Shahi  ( – 17 December 2019) was an Indian politician from Bihar. He was a legislator of the Bihar Legislative Assembly.

Biography
Shahi was elected as a legislator of the Bihar Legislative Assembly from Maharajganj as a Praja Socialist Party candidate in 1967.

Shahi died on 17 December 2019 at the age of 103.

References

1910s births
2019 deaths
Year of birth uncertain
Praja Socialist Party politicians
Members of the Bihar Legislative Assembly
People from Siwan district
Indian centenarians
Men centenarians